Far Out may refer to:

 Far Out (book), a 1961 collection of science fiction stories by Damon Knight
 Far Out Recordings, UK based record label specializing in the music of Brazil
 Far Out (album), 1999 album by Tadpoles
 "Far Out", a song by Blur from their 1994 album Parklife
 Farout, a temporary nickname for the distant trans-Neptunian object 
 Far Out Magazine, a British culture magazine

See also

 Far Out Corporation, an Australian rock band
 A Far Out Disc, a 1985 album by Toy Dolls
 Far Out Man, a 1990 comedy film written, directed by and starring Tommy Chong
 FarFarOut, a temporary nickname for the distant trans-Neptunian object 
 "Far Far Out!", a 2012 TV episode of Chopped!; see List of Chopped episodes (seasons 1–20)
 
 
 Far (disambiguation)
 Out (disambiguation)